Augustos Zerlendis sometimes spelled Avgoustos Zerlentis (Greek: Αύγουστος Ζερλέντης ; 5 November 1886 – 1954) was a Greek tennis player who competed at the 1920 Olympic Games in Antwerp. He reached the fourth round of the 1920 Wimbledon Championships singles competition. Between 1927 and 1931 he played in seven ties for the Greek Davis Cup team.

Early life and family
Augustus Zerlentis' family originated from Chios but he was born in Egypt, where his parents had moved in 1886. He was born as a son of George Zerlendi and Leonora Eleni Agelasto. He started tennis at age 19 in 1905. In World War I he served in the British Red Cross and St. John of Jerusalem within the British forces.

Tennis career
In 1911 Zerlendis toured Switzerland to attend matches in different cities. Around that time it happened that he met with the United States champion R. Norris Williams, whose playing technique had a big impact and influence on his later style. In 1913 he won the International Championships of Alexandria against French player H.J. Pailhé and, the next year he won the International Championships of Egypt, a title which he retained for many years onwards. He joined the Athens Lawn Tennis Club in 1923. He went on to claim three singles championships of Greece (1928, 1929, 1931) and in two additional categories (men's doubles in 1928 and 1929 and mixed doubles in 1928). In 1932 he was ranked second on the Greek rankings.

He represented his country in the Davis Cup (1927, 1928, 1929, 1930, 1931), the Balkan Games in 1930 and 1931 and in the Olympics in 1924 and 1920, the latter in which his first round elimination by Francis Lowe still holds the longest Olympic match record with its 76 game.  Prior to his Davis Cup enlistment in 1926 he was drafted into a meeting between Greece and Czechoslovakia and won the first two rubbers in singles and second in men's doubles. In 1928 in a mixed team match against Hungary in Budapest the Greek troupe was whitewashed by the host nation. Zerlendis was defeated in doubles and mixed doubles as well. It was the second consecutive loss of Greece from Hungary in the second straight year.  More involvement in team events came at the challenge between Vienna and Athens in 1928, at the meetings between the Union Sportive Française d'Alexandrie and Tewfikief Tennis Club of Cairo (1932, 1935, 1936, 1938, 1939), at a meeting between the All Egypt Club and Milano L.C.T. in 1932, at the Games of Y.M.C.A. in 1936, at the Games of New Sports Club of Alexandria in 1936, at the Games of Smouha Club Alexandria, in the last he won the third place in 1938. 

His international individual accomplishments includes the Championship of the Eastern Mediterranean eight titles (singles 1925, 1926, 1929,
1930/men's doubles 1925/mixed doubles 1925, 1926, 1929). At the International Championships in Cairo he was crowned four times, first a double victory in 1924 at the Gezira Sporting Club in single and mixed doubles then a doubles victory in 1931 to come full circle and exactly a decade later of his first a repeated singles triumph in 1934. He participated in the Championship of Cairo in 1935 and the Egyptian Championships on multiple occasions (1931, 1933, 1934, 1935, 1938, 1940). Moreover, he competed in the Egyptian International Championships (1939), International Championships of Alexandria (1934, 1936, 1937, 1938) and the Championship of Alexandria (1934). Among the numerous trophies he held was the Championship of Thessaloniki in 1929, the Greek Autumn Championship. 

He died in 1954 at age 68.

Playing style
Eventual world number one Bill Tilden described Zerlendis in 1921 as "[...] a baseliner of the most pronounced type. He gets everything he can put his racquet to. He reminds me irresistibly of Mavrogordato, seemingly reaching nothing yet they all come back. I cannot adequately analyse his game because his first principle is to put back the ball no matter how, and this he carries into excellent effect. Zerlendi is a match winner first and a stylist second."

Notes
 However his Swiss immigration record gives 1887 as his birth year.
 The score was 14–12, 8–10, 5–7, 6–4, 6–4 to Lowe and the match duration was between five and a half and six hours.

Footnotes

Works cited

Books

Documents

Online media

Periodicals

External links
 
 
 

Greek male tennis players
Olympic tennis players of Greece
Tennis players at the 1920 Summer Olympics
Tennis players at the 1924 Summer Olympics
Egyptian people of Greek descent
English people of Greek descent
1886 births
1954 deaths
Date of death missing
Egyptian male tennis players
Sportspeople from Alexandria